Pontederia is a genus of tristylous aquatic plants, members of which are commonly known as pickerel weeds. Pontederia is endemic to the Americas, distributed from Canada to Argentina, where it is found in shallow water or on mud. The genus was named by Linnaeus in honour of the Italian botanist Giulio Pontedera.

Pontederia plants have large waxy leaves, succulent stems and a thick pad of fibrous roots. The roots give rise to rhizomes that allow rapid colonization by vegetative reproduction. Species are perennial, and produce a large spike of flowers in the summer. There is a species of bee (Dufourea novaeangliae) that exclusively visits Pontederia cordata; waterfowl also eat the fruit of the plant.

Pontederia cordata and Pontederia crassipes (formerly known as Eichhornia crassipes), have become invasive in many tropical and temperate parts of the globe, but are, on the other hand, efficient biological filters of polluted water in constructed wetlands.

Species
Pontederia includes the following 25 accepted species:

 Pontederia africana (Solms) M.Pell. & C.N.Horn
 Pontederia australasica (Ridl.) M.Pell. & C.N.Horn
 Pontederia azurea Sw.
 Pontederia brevipetiolata (Verdc.) M.Pell. & C.N.Horn
 Pontederia cordata L.
 Pontederia crassipes Mart.
 Pontederia cyanea (F.Muell.) M.Pell. & C.N.Horn
 Pontederia diversifolia (Vahl) M.Pell. & C.N.Horn
 Pontederia elata (Ridl.) M.Pell. & C.N.Horn
 Pontederia hastata L.
 Pontederia heterosperma (Alexander) M.Pell. & C.N.Horn
 Pontederia korsakowii (Regel & Maack) M.Pell. & C.N.Horn
 Pontederia meyeri (A.G.Schulz) M.Pell. & C.N.Horn
 Pontederia natans P.Beauv.
 Pontederia ovalis Mart. ex Schult. & Schult.f.
 Pontederia paniculata Spreng.
 Pontederia paradoxa Mart. ex Schult. & Schult.f.
 Pontederia parviflora Alexander
 Pontederia plantaginea Roxb.
 Pontederia rotundifolia L.f.
 Pontederia sagittata C.Presl
 Pontederia subovata (Seub.) Lowden
 Pontederia triflora (Seub.) G.Agostini, D.Velázquez & J.Velásquez
 Pontederia vaginalis Burm.f.
 Pontederia valida (G.X.Wang & Nagam.) M.Pell. & C.N.Horn

References

External links
 Google Books - Creating Freshwater Wetlands by Donald A. Hammer
 

Pontederiaceae
Commelinales genera
Aquatic plants
Taxa named by Carl Linnaeus